David Juncà Reñe (born 16 November 1993) is a Spanish professional footballer who plays as a left-back for Polish club Wisła Kraków.

Club career

Girona
Born in Riumors, Girona, Catalonia, Juncà was a product of Girona FC's youth system. He made his official debut with the first team on 17 December 2011, playing one minute in a 3–2 home win against Gimnàstic de Tarragona in the Segunda División.

The following two seasons, Juncá played for both the reserves and farm team CF Riudellots. Returned for 2014–15, he scored his first goal as a professional on 14 September 2014, closing the 1–1 away draw with Sporting de Gijón.

Eibar
Juncà signed a three-year deal with La Liga club SD Eibar on 28 July 2015, after being terminated at the Estadi Montilivi. He made his debut in the competition on 24 August, coming on as a second-half substitute for Saúl Berjón in the 3–1 away victory over Granada CF.

Celta
On 4 June 2018, the free agent Juncà agreed to a five-year contract at fellow top-flight side RC Celta de Vigo. He contributed 21 matches in his debut campaign for the last team above the relegation zone, but subsequently spent nearly two years on the sidelines due to several injury problems.

Girona return
Juncà returned to Girona on 26 July 2021, having joined on a one-year deal. He totalled 28 appearances in his second spell, winning promotion to the top tier in the playoffs.

Wisła Kraków
Having started the 2022–23 season without a team, Juncá signed a six-month deal with Polish I liga club Wisła Kraków on 29 December 2022.

Career statistics

Club

References

External links

1993 births
Living people
People from Alt Empordà
Sportspeople from the Province of Girona
Spanish footballers
Footballers from Catalonia
Association football defenders
La Liga players
Segunda División players
Divisiones Regionales de Fútbol players
Girona FC players
Girona FC B players
SD Eibar footballers
RC Celta de Vigo players
I liga players
Wisła Kraków players
Spanish expatriate footballers
Expatriate footballers in Poland
Spanish expatriate sportspeople in Poland